The Pinkpop Festival is an annual music festival held at Landgraaf, Netherlands. It is usually held on the Pentecost weekend (Pinksteren in Dutch, hence the name). If Pentecost falls on an early date in May, the festival is held later in June. Starting in 1970, at Burgemeester Damen Sportpark in the city of Geleen, Pinkpop is the oldest and longest running annual dedicated pop and rock music festival in the world.

Nowadays, Pinkpop is a three-day festival, from Saturday through Monday when on Pentecost weekend, or Friday through Sunday otherwise, with a 60,000 people per day capacity, and with performances on 4 separate stages. From 2006 through 2011, Pinkpop sold out six years in a row. During 44 editions, more than 2 million people have attended Pinkpop. Some 700 music acts have played at the festival.

In 1994 (the 25th edition), it was decided to sell only 60,000 tickets, to prevent overcrowding due to the popularity of the festival. In 1995, it was made into a 2-day festival. Two years later, in 1997, this was further expanded to three days.

2007 saw a spin-off, later in the year, on 11 August, called Pinkpop Classic, for an older rock audience, with bands that previously performed there in past decades. This spin-off was held again in following years, with exception of 2011, in which the organisation was not able to sign enough interesting older bands.

In 2008, Pinkpop was for the first time in its history not held on Pentecost weekend, which fell too early that year for the convenience of fans and performers alike. This was decided following the 2005 edition, in which the Pentecost weekend also fell early and therefore Pinkpop could not convince many great performers to come play at the festival. Sales were disappointing in 2005, so by shifting the 2008 festival, the organisation hoped to solve these problems. Pinkpop 2008 turned out to have had the largest concert attendance to date. The dates for the 2010, 2013, 2015 and 2016 edition have been shifted as well, for similar reasons. The 2020 and 2021 Pinkpop festivals were not held due to the COVID-19 pandemic.

Name and logo

The name consists of two parts. 'Pink' comes from the Dutch word for Pentecost (Pinksteren) and 'pop' comes from pop music (or 'popular music'). But a later creative interpretation for the name combines the English word pink and the Dutch word pop, which means doll, thus forming the origin for the logo, a doll in a pink dress.

The precursor to Pinkpop was held on Pentecost Monday in 1969. It was completely free, and called Pinknick because people were supposed to bring their own food. Only a free pig roast and free apples were provided by the organizers. Inspired by the Monterey festival from 1967, a number of hip local bands were persuaded to come and play unpaid. Almost 10,000 visitors were attracted, ranging from pop music lovers to grandparents and their grandchildren. And families with empty shopping bags, loading up on apples.

Editions

2007
Pinkpop 2007 was held May 26–28.

It was the 20th time the event was held at the Megaland Park.

On February 28, most of the line-up was revealed. Pearl Jam was announced to make their 3rd appearance on the Pinkpop stage, but they cancelled, for two of their members would become fathers in the Pentecost weekend.

 Krezip replaced Amy Winehouse, because she had to cancel due to illness. Krezip started their gig playing Amy Winehouse's "Rehab".

2008
Pinkpop 2008 was held May 30 – June 1 in the Landgraaf Megaland Park.

Pinkpop 2008 had the largest audience of concert attendees to date, with an average of just over 60,000 people arriving each of the three days, prompting the festival organizers to announce that 180,000 people had visited the festival. Because the 42,500 available three-day passes sold out completely, the actual number of unique visitors is 94,000.

 Animal Alpha replaced Novastar, because they experienced delays in recording their new album.
 Eagles of Death Metal replaced Chris Cornell, because he had obligations in the studio.

2009
Pinkpop 2009 was held May 30 – June 1.

On March 4, 2009, the Pinkpop Board gave a press conference in Paradiso in Amsterdam, to answer questions from the press and announce which artists will be performing on Pinkpop 2009 will be announced.

 Krezip replaced Depeche Mode, because lead singer Dave Gahan had to undergo a procedure after a tumor was spotted in his bladder two weeks before Pinkpop. Placebo replaced Depeche Mode as headliner.

2010
Pinkpop 2010 was held May 28–30.

 Ryan Shaw replaced Wolfmother, because lead singer Andrew Stockdale was too sick to go on tour. Wolfmother was first planned on Sunday, but Triggerfinger covered their spot, so Ryan Shaw could play on Saturday.

2011
Pinkpop 2011 was held June 11–13.

2012
Pinkpop 2012 was held May 26–28.

 At first Kasabian would perform as well, but they had to cancel due to private matters. Kyuss Lives! replaced Kasabian's spot, Moss covered Kyuss Lives!'s spot.

2013
Pinkpop 2013 was held June 14–16; the third time that it was not held in the weekend of Pentecost.

2014
Pinkpop 2014 was held June 7–9.

2015
Pinkpop 2015 was held June 12–14; the fourth time that it will not be held in the weekend of Pentecost.

 At first Sam Smith would perform as well, but he had to cancel due to voice problems. Placebo replaced Sam Smith's spot.
 Originally the Foo Fighters would serve as the festival's headliner but had to cancel their performance due to a broken leg by frontman Dave Grohl two days earlier. Pharrell Williams became headliner instead and the Flemish trio Triggerfinger was added as a last-minute addition to the line-up.

2016

Pinkpop 2016 was held June 10–12.

2017
Pinkpop 2017 was held June 3–5.

2018
Pinkpop 2018 was held June 15–17.

A fatal traffic accident involving festival-goers took place in the early morning of June 18. After the festival, at around 04:00, a group of persons sat on the road near Campsite B, which was not closed to vehicular traffic. Information as it is now, indicates that a white Opel van travelling along this road could not avoid the group and ran into them, killing one and severely injuring three more. The driver reported himself to the police several hours later in Amsterdam.

During the performance of the Foo Fighters on June 16, the disintegration of a large meteor was observed in the sky right behind the main stage and caught on video. The fireball and its disintegration was widely observed also elsewhere in the Benelux countries, Germany and France. An analysis of over 200 eyewitness reports suggests that the disintegration took place at 23:11 local time near the Belgian city of Liège.

2019 
Pinkpop 2019 was held June 8–10.

This marked Pinkpop's 50th anniversary.

2020 
Pinkpop 2020 was planned for 19–21 June but was cancelled due to the COVID-19 pandemic.

Acts scheduled to appear included, in order of billing:

 Guns N' Roses
 Post Malone
 Red Hot Chili Peppers
 Deftones
 Disturbed
 Keane
 Marshmello
 Twenty One Pilots
 Volbeat
 Zara Larsson
 Anderson .Paak & The Free Nationals
 Ares
 Balthazar
 Bishop Briggs
 Chef'special
 Crowded House
 Danny Vera
 Dermot Kennedy
 Ellie Goulding
 Five Seconds of Summer
 Floor Jansen
 Frank Carter & The Rattlesnakes
 Frenna Deluxe
 Gojira
 Inhaler
 James Arthur
 JC Stewart
 Joost
 Kensington
 Liam Payne
 Lost Frequencies
 Mabel
 Maisie Peters
 Nona
 Nothing But Thieves
 Of Monsters and Men
 Querbeat
 Rag'n'Bone Man
 Saint Phnx
 Sea Girls
 Supergrass
 Ten Times a Million
 The Big Moon
 The Kik
 The Last Internationale
 The Marcus King Band
 The Pretty Reckless
 Velvet Volume

2021 
Pinkpop 2021 was planned for 18–20 June but, like in the previous year, was cancelled due to the COVID-19 pandemic.

Acts scheduled to appear included:

 Deftones
 Frenna
 Kensington
 Pearl Jam
 Red Hot Chili Peppers
 Twenty One Pilots
 Ares
 Danny Vera
 Elle Hollis
 JC Stewart
 Joost
 Nona
 Ten Times A Million

2022 
Pinkpop 2022 took place from 17–19 June.

2023 

Pinkpop 2023 will take place from 16–18 June.

Acts scheduled to appear 

P!nk
Robbie Williams
Red Hot Chili Peppers
Editors
Queens of the Stone Age

See also
List of historic rock festivals

References

External links

 Official site (English); and facts and figures page
 Myspace page for Pinkpop - Myspace site (Dutch)
 3Voor12 Articles, Audio, Video and more about Pinkpop 2007

Rock festivals in the Netherlands
1970 establishments in the Netherlands
Music festivals established in 1970
Pop music festivals
Music festivals in the Netherlands
Music in Limburg (Netherlands)
South Limburg (Netherlands)
Landgraaf